Wellville is a rural unincorporated community in Nottoway County, in the U.S. state of Virginia. In the mid-nineteenth century, the town was a stop on the Southside Railroad, which became the Atlantic, Mississippi and Ohio Railroad in 1870 and then a line in the Norfolk and Western Railway. It is now the Norfolk Southern Railway.

Namozine Creek has its source just northeast.

References

Unincorporated communities in Nottoway County, Virginia
Unincorporated communities in Virginia